Pierre Hervé Ateme Elanga  (born 25 September 1986) is a Cameroonian former professional footballer who played as a forward.

Career
Ateme was born in Yaoundé.

He played 2005 for the Cameroonian U17 and 2008 for the U23 of Cameroon.

He played from 2004 to 2009 for FC Foudre.

Ateme played four games for the Slovakian side Dunajská Streda in 2009.

In June 2011 he moved to Belgium signing for UR Namur. After four months he left Belgium and returned to Cameroon, to sign for Cosmos de Bafia. In January 2013 he returned to Europe and signed for North Cyprus side Küçük Kaymaklı Türk SK.

References

External links
Football Line-Ups Profile

1986 births
Living people
Footballers from Yaoundé
Cameroonian footballers
Association football forwards
FC DAC 1904 Dunajská Streda players
Tonnerre Yaoundé players
Union Royale Namur Fosses-La-Ville players
Cameroonian expatriate footballers
Cameroonian expatriate sportspeople in Slovakia
Expatriate footballers in Slovakia
Cameroonian expatriate sportspeople in Belgium
Expatriate footballers in Belgium
Cameroonian expatriate sportspeople in Northern Cyprus
Expatriate footballers in Northern Cyprus